King Biscuit Flower Hour Presents: Deep Purple in Concert is a live album taken from a Deep Purple performance originally broadcast on the King Biscuit Flower Hour, released in July 1995. It contains concert material recorded on 27 February 1976 at Long Beach Arena, Los Angeles, CA featuring the Mark IV line-up with Tommy Bolin.

Overview
The concert was recorded on 27 February 1976 at Long Beach Arena, Los Angeles, CA. The album also contains four bonus tracks recorded at a Deep Purple concert on 26 January 1976 in Springfield, MA. This concert was originally intended to be used for the King Biscuit broadcast, but imperfections in the recording made the entire show unsuitable for airing and forced the second taping in Long Beach one month later.

Releases
The album was released in the U.K. in June 1995 with the title On the Wings of a Russian Foxbat (Connoisseur DPVSOP CD 217). In 2000, a partial set consisting of ten songs was published by BMG under the name Extended Versions. The album was remastered and re-released with new cover art as Live at Long Beach 1976 on 24 February 2009 by Purple Records.

Note the CD1 track listing quotes "The Grind" as being performed; this is incorrect as it is the Bolin solo song "Homeward Strut".

Track listing

Standard version

Extended Versions

Live at Long Beach 1976

Personnel
Deep Purple
David Coverdale – lead vocals
Tommy Bolin – guitar, vocals
Jon Lord – keyboards, organ, synthesizers, backing vocals
Glenn Hughes – bass, vocals
Ian Paice – drums, percussion

Production
Gary Lyons – mixing and mastering
Evert Wilbrink, Steve Ship, Barry Ehrmann, Michael Berrshein – executive producers

References

External links

 Live at Long Beach 1976 Amazon

1996 live albums
Deep Purple live albums
Bertelsmann Music Group live albums
Purple Records live albums